Tenuia is a genus of flies in the family Pseudopomyzidae.

Distribution
Russia, Philippines.

Species
Tenuia nigripes Malloch, 1926
Tenuia smirnovi Shatalkin, 1995

References

Pseudopomyzidae
Brachycera genera
Taxa named by John Russell Malloch
Diptera of Asia